Colombia is divided into 32 departments. These in turn are divided into municipalities, though some receive the special category of district. However, there are also provinces, a generic name applied to provinces, districts, regions and subregions. These are generally internal administrative authorities of the departments, more historical than legal. Most Colombian departments have this kind of subdivision. Those that do not are the departments of Amazonas, Arauca, Caquetá, Casanare, Guainía, Guaviare, Putumayo, San Andrés y Providencia, Vaupés, and Vichada.

List of provinces

See also 
 Regions of Colombia
 Departments of Colombia
 Municipalities of Colombia
 Districts of Colombia

References 

 
Subdivisions of Colombia
Colombia geography-related lists
Colombia, Provinces